John F. Lance (October 29, 1897 – September 10, 1981) was an American football and college basketball coach. He served as the head football coach at Southwestern Oklahoma State University from 1918 to 1921.

Lance's greatest coaching feats occurred on the hardwood, where he amassed a career record of 643 wins and 345 losses serving as the head men's basketball coach at Southwestern Oklahoma State (1918–1921) and at Pittsburg State University in Pittsburg, Kansas (1922–1934, 1935–1963). He became just the fifth coach in college basketball history to reach 600 career wins, joining the ranks of Ed Diddle, Hank Iba, Adolph Rupp, and Phog Allen. He led Pittsburg State to a 47-game win streak from 1929 to 1932, a record that stood for nearly a quarter of a century until the Bill Russell-led San Francisco Dons eclipsed that mark from 1955 to 1957.

References

1897 births
1981 deaths
Basketball coaches from Kansas
People from Pittsburg, Kansas
Pittsburg State Gorillas football players
Pittsburg State Gorillas men's basketball coaches
Players of American football from Kansas
Southwestern Oklahoma State Bulldogs football coaches